The following is a list of British Comic Strips. A comic strip is a sequence of drawings arranged in interrelated panels to display brief humor or form a narrative, often serialized, with text in balloons and captions.

The coloured backgrounds denote the publisher:
 – indicates D. C. Thomson.
 – indicates AP, Fleetway and IPC Comics.
 – indicates Viz.
 – indicates a strip published in a newspaper.

Lesser known British comic strips

 Belinda was modelled after the American Strip Little Orphan Annie was published in the Daily Mirror. It was drawn by Steve Dowling and Tony Royle during the 1930s & 1940s.
 Billy and Bunny was a long-running comic strip featured in a Scottish Newspaper. They were drawn by James Crighton better known for drawing Korky the Cat for The Dandy comic. Billy was a young boy and Bunny was an anthropomorphised rabbit. Their stories were set in a fantasy fairytale world where they often got up to mischief. There were several annuals from 1922 to 1941 and in 1948 & 1949. Even on the last 1949 Annual, they were still wearing their early 1920s trademark spats and gaiters, a popular male fashion item from decades before. These annuals were all published by John Leng & Co, London
 Boy meets Girl was started in the Sunday Dispatch in 1940. It was drawn by Rouson and featured amusing ways of boy meeting girl
 Carol Day was a strip created by painter David Wright, and continued after his death by Kenneth Inns. It was published initially in 1956 in the Daily Mail, but later in 1971, it was in the Sunday Express. Carol was an ex-fashion model and was drawn as being very elegant.
 Come on Steve Published initially in the Sunday Express in 1936 and transferred to the Sunday Dispatch in 1941. It was drawn by Roland Davies. The character "Steve" was a cart horse name after the British jockey Steve Donoghue. The expression "Come on Steve" was a cheer used by racing fans to encourage Donoghue.
 Dot and Carrie was introduced as a three-month trial in the London Evening Standard at the end of 1922. It transferred to the London Evening News on 18 October 1960, finally ceasing on 23 May 1964. its author was J F Horrabin. Dot and Carrie were secretaries in an office under a Mr Spillikin.
 Eb and Flo were drawn by Wilfred Haughton who also drew the Mickey Mouse Annuals from 1931 to 1939 and the Mickey Mouse Weekly comic covers as well as the Bobby Bear annuals in the 1930s. Haughton first drew this cartoon strip for The Daily Herald before his 1930s Disney work. It was about two Negro orphans, Ebenezer and Florence, who acted as parents to the unnamed Twins. Also featured were Timothy - a school pal, Uncles Joe and Desmond, Auntie Kate, Gran'pa and their pup, Sausage. There was a later annual published in 1939 (as dated by a 1939 inscription as found in a copy) by Deans called Eb' and Flo' annual which featured stories and reprinted cartoon strips all in a similar style to the Mickey Mouse Annuals. From their initial appearance in the late 1920s, an enamelled badge shows Eb and Flo were the characters related to the 'Cheery Coons Club' for the Sunday People newspaper in the early 1930s.
 Flint of the Flying Squad was published in the Daily Express, starting in 1952. It was written by Alan Stranks and drawn by George Davies. The characters were used on a BBC Radio Home Service series in 1952, starring Bruce Seton, Mary Mackenzie & Norman Claridge. This used the same title
 Jimpy was drawn by Hugh McClelland (cartoonist). It started in the Daily Mirror on 5 January 1946 and lasted for six years. Set in medieval times the main character was a youth trying to become an apprentice wizard.  Selection of title frames
 The Larks drawn by Jack Dunkley in the Daily Mirror, it was first seen on 5 August 1957.
 Lord God Almighty by Steve Bell appeared in The Leveller in the 1970s
 The Nipper started during 1933 in the Daily Mail and was drawn by Brian White (cartoonist). An annual was produced for many years. The nipper was a child of about 2 years age, who was able to get into the mischief of children of that age  . It should not be confused with the Canadian comic strip by Doug Wright about a similar child, but about 4 years old, and in a Canadian suburban setting.
 Paul Temple a strip based on Francis Durbridge's radio detective started in the London Evening News 19 November 1951 and lasted over twenty years, The graphics were by Alfred Sindall.
 Penny by George Davies appeared in the Sunday Pictorial during the 1940s and 1950s. The strip is featured in the film Penny and the Pownall Case (1948).
 Psycops. A strip that appeared in The Sun between 1994 and 1999. Written by Pete Nash (Striker) and illustrated by Nash, John Cooper and John M Burns.
 Sporting Sam was thirty years from 1944 in the Sunday Express. It was produced by Reg Wootton.
 Spotlight on Sally by Arthur Ferrier appeared in the News of the World at the end of World War II. It was contemporary and competed with the strip Jane.
 Tim, Toots & Teeny''' were a cartoon strip in the Daily Chronicle newspaper from at least 1929, and there were several annuals issued starting in 1930 to at least 1937, as the undated 1931 to 1938 Annuals inclusive. These annuals were published by George Newnes of London, and feature Tim (a cat), Toots (a pig) and Tiny (a duck). The first 1931 Annual states 'A Whole Year Of Adventure with the Famous Pets'. No artist or linked newspaper name is mentioned in these annuals, leaving them remaining unknown until two Christmas and Birthday postcards revealed their origins. A copy of the 1934 annual was found in the printer's archives, Jarrold & Sons Ltd, Norwich, stamped 'Jarrolds Factory Book Dept.' To identify the set of eight Tim Toots & Teeny Annual books, 1931 Orange Car, 1932 Leapfrog, 1933 Train, 1934 Bicycle, 1935 Toy Plane, 1936 River Boat, 1937 Treehouse & 1938 Fairground are the front covers.
 Varoomshka'' by John Kent appeared in The Guardian in the 1970s.

See also

 British comics
 List of Beano comic strips
 List of Dandy comic strips
 List of Viz comic strips
 List of 2000 AD stories
 List of D. C. Thomson & Co. Ltd publications
 List of AP, Fleetway and IPC Comics publications

References

British comic strips
British